This is a season-by-season list of records compiled by Army West Point in men's ice hockey.

Army is one of the oldest programs in college hockey, having first fielded a team in 1903 and is second only to Yale in terms of consecutive seasons played. Despite their longevity, Army's ice hockey team has never made an appearance in a national tournament.

Season-by-season results

Note: GP = Games played, W = Wins, L = Losses, T = Ties

* Winning percentage is used when conference schedules are unbalanced.

Footnotes

References

Army Black Knights men's ice hockey seasons
Lists of college men's ice hockey seasons in the United States
Army Black Knights ice hockey seasons